Just William's Luck is a 1947 British comedy film directed by Val Guest and starring William Graham, Garry Marsh and Jane Welsh. The film was based on the Just William series of books by Richmal Crompton. Crompton was impressed with the film and wrote a novel Just William's Luck based on the events of the film. The following year a second film William Comes to Town was made.

Plot
William Brown, leader of his gang, "The Outlaws", while exploring/playing in a "haunted house", stumble across a gang of fur thieves.  The children are kidnapped and are bundled into the back of a lorry which drives off.  Spotting a large bag of flour, the boys proceed to kick it open.  Its contents spill through a gap in the floorboards of the truck's cargo bay.  This leaves a trail on the road for the police to follow who ultimately catch and foil the gang of fur robbers.

Cast
 William Graham - William Brown
 Garry Marsh - Mr. Brown
 Jane Welsh - Mrs. Brown
 Hugh Cross - Robert Brown
 Kathleen Stuart - Ethel Brown
 Leslie Bradley - The Boss
 A. E. Matthews - The Tramp
 Muriel Aked - Emily, the Maid
 Brian Roper - Ginger
 Brian Weske - Henry
 Audrey Manning - Violet Elizabeth
 Hy Hazell - Gloria Gail
 Patricia Cutts - Gloria's Secretary
 James Crabbe - Douglas
 Michael Balfour - Jenks
 Ivan Hyde - Glazier
 Joan Hickson - Hubert's Mother
 John Powe - Policeman
 Anne Marie - Masseur
 Leslie Hazell - Hubert's Gang
 Peter David - Hubert's Gang
 John O'Hara - Hubert's Gang
 Michael Medwin - The Boss's Gang
 John Martell - Johnnie
 Ivan Craig - The Boss's Gang

Critical reception
Radio Times wrote, "while William Graham captures something of the scruffy boisterousness of Richmal Crompton's timeless comic creation, director Val Guest's screenplay smoothes away the rougher edges to produce a sanitised tale of childhood mayhem, suitable for young eyes. The same paternalism dogged the sequel, William at the Circus"; while Sky Movies wrote, "it's a lively romp with a jolly knockabout climax in a house that William and his gang of `outlaws' are trying to haunt."

References

Bibliography
 Collins, Fiona & Ridgman, Jeremy. Turning the Page: Children's Literature in Performance and the Media. Peter Lang, 2006.

External links 
 

1947 films
Films directed by Val Guest
Films based on children's books
British comedy films
Just William
1940s children's comedy films
1947 comedy films
British black-and-white films
1940s British films